Host Universal is an ethical brand strategy and communications network founded in 1997 by Robin Smith. Host works with clients on projects that seek to achieve social or environmental impact. Host has a core team in London, UK, and creates specialist teams for digital, print, video, film, brand identity, and live events, worldwide.

History
Host was set up in 1997 to work with Anita Roddick at The Body Shop International. The partnership created a global Self-Esteem strategy and creative campaign featuring Ruby, a size 16 doll, who was presented to be a role model for women. The campaign aimed to bring attention to the issue of the media waif and skeletal supermodels, particularly for eating disorders and extreme diets that develop due to negative self-image. Roddick posited that fashion stereotypes did nothing for a woman’s self-esteem and, in the long term, are seriously damaging for society, stating “once upon a time we cut a suit to fit a body, now we cut bodies to fit suits”. The global Self Esteem strategy was later picked up and utilized by Dove.

Projects
Host has been involved with Cafédirect from the company’s conception through to 2006. Host Universal worked with Cafédirect in developing brand strategy and implementing design and communication work that included the creation of instant coffee product 5065 and the 5065 Lift Theatre group. Host developed the communications strategy behind the Cafédirect Share Issue in 2004. Penny Newman, CEO of Cafédirect, said "we would not be where we are today without Host".

Host works with British Entrepreneur Dale Vince, the founder and CEO of Ecotricity.

One of the projects for Host in 2008 was starting a company called the United Bank of Carbon (UBoC), in partnership with Jonathan Wild, the Chairman of Bettys and Taylors of Harrogate. UBoC aims to develop sustainable investment opportunities for businesses and brands within the world’s remaining rainforest.

In 2009 Host worked on a rebranding project with Paul Myers and his team at IFAT. IFAT changed its name to the World Fair Trade Organization (WFTO) in February 2009. WFTO aims to create a sustainable global trading system. In 2009, Host created the World Fair Trade Day website that on 8 May 2009 became the hub for 1000 events in 70 countries.

In 2010, Host was developing strategy and communications for social finance.

See also
Business ethics

References

External links

 The background of Cafedirect

British companies established in 1997
1997 establishments in England
Social enterprises